Howard Stark was a professional American football player who played offensive lineman for two seasons for the Racine Legion. Stark had attended West Division Sr. High School before playing at the collegiate level with the Wisconsin Badgers.

References

1896 births
Players of American football from Milwaukee
American football offensive linemen
Racine Legion players
Wisconsin Badgers football players
1981 deaths